Artocarpus nobilis, the Ceylon breadfruit, is a tree species in the family Moraceae. It is endemic to south western regions of Sri Lanka. It is known as "Wal dhel - වල් දෙල්" , "Baedi dhel - බැදි දෙල්" or as "Hingala dhel - හිංගල දෙල්" by local people.

The plant is known to infect by Rigidoporus microporus to cause White root disease. This is the first time that the pathogen was found instead of Hevea brasiliensis.

Description
Ceylon breadfruit is an evergreen plant with about 25m height. The seeds and fruits are used for medicinal purposes for the worm diseases caused by nematode Ascaris lumbricoides.

Chemistry
Artocarpus nobilis contains prenylated flavonoids, xanthonoids in its root bark, geranylated phenolic compounds in its fruits, geranyl chalcones in its leaves and pyranodihydrobenzoxanthones isolated from the bark.

References

External links
Photos of Artocarpus nobilis
jstor.org

Flora of Sri Lanka
nobilis
Vulnerable plants
Taxonomy articles created by Polbot